Max Elto, formerly known as Taped Rai, is a Swedish vocal duo consisting of Tom Liljegren and Alexander Ryberg. They are best known for providing vocals for David Guetta's single "Just One Last Time" and releasing their 2013 debut single "Shadow of the Sun".

Career

2012—2014: Beginnings as Taped Rai
The duo was formed of Tom Liljegren and Alexander Ryberg and first got together in mid-2012. After working and practising as a vocalist group, they were signed by American and British music label Big Beat Records.

The duo were later inspired as they went on to collaborate with other big names in the music industry. Their debut performance was with David Guetta, featuring vocals on his 2012 single "Just One Last Time" which later appeared on his eighth studio album Nothing But the Beat and its later versions Nothing but the Beat 2.0 and Nothing but the Beat: Ultimate. The featured single later peaked at number 20 in the UK singles chart.

In 2013, the duo produced and released their debut single "Shadow Of The Sun". They followed up with single "Backyard Animals", which came out later in the same year.

2014—2015: Rebranding as Max Elto
The duo, after releasing two singles in 2013, decided that they needed to change and re-invent themselves and, as of 2014, they were officially known as Max Elto.

This led onto their digital and social media expansion, together with the major improvement of their Facebook page. Both of their singles "Shadow Of The Sun" and "Backyard Animals" were re-released under their new name with music videos for each and at the same time, they announced the songs under their 2014 debut extended play, self-titled Taped Rai which was released shortly afterwards.

After releasing their debut EP, they released the music video for their third single, titled "Daniel", and released "Citylights", both of which were songs off of their EP.

Approaching the end of 2014, they announced the release of their first non-EP song which was titled "Somebody Like You". It was released in early 2015. Towards the middle of 2015, "Citylights" was released officially with a music video.

2015—present: Temporary split and solo careers
Ever since the release of their single "Citylights", the duo have decided that they needed to grow as solo artists and then reunite after their individual popularity increases. They introduced their solo stage names: Tom Taped (Tom Liljegren) and Alex Aris (Alexander Ryberg). Since then, the two have been working independently with different artists.

In early 2016, Tom Taped was signed under Armada Music and released his debut solo single, titled "It Doesn't Matter". Alex Aris later followed with his solo debut as a featured artist, with his vocals placed alongside Enya in Salvatore Ganacci's single, "Dive".

Discography: Taped Rai / Max Elto

EPs
 Taped Rai (2014)

Singles
As lead artist

As featured artist

Discography: Alex Aris
as featured artist

Discography: Tom Taped
as lead artist

References

Swedish musical duos